Alfred Steinkirchner (born 23 October 1956) is an Austrian former professional footballer who played as a forward.

References

1956 births
Living people
Association football forwards
Austrian footballers
Bundesliga players
1. FC Nürnberg players
SC Freiburg players
Stuttgarter Kickers players
Austrian football managers
People from Straubing
Sportspeople from Lower Bavaria